Les Hunter is the name of:

People
Les Hunter (basketball) (1942–2000), American basketball player
Les Hunter (footballer) (born 1958), English footballer
Les Hunter (politician) (1927–2012), New Zealand politician

Fictional characters
Les Hunter (Hollyoaks), TV soap character

See also
Leslie Hunter (1877–1931), Scottish painter
Leslie Hunter (bishop) (1890–1983), Bishop of Sheffield